Forza Sempre: sucessos da Legião Urbana em italiano is an album by Brazilian singer Jerry Adriani. All but the last track are cover versions of songs by Brazilian rock band Legião Urbana, translated from the original Portuguese to the Italian language.

Track listing

 "Una Volta" ("Há Tempos") — 3:58
 "Monte Castello" ("Monte Castelo") — 4:11
 "Vento Sul Litorale" ("Vento No Litoral") — 6:15
 "Angra dos Reis" — 5:22
 "Quando Il Sole Entrerà Dalla Finestra Della Tua Stanza" ("Quando O Sol Bater Na Janela Do Seu Quarto") — 3:25
 "Nel frattempo" ("Por Enquanto") — 3:07
 "Andrea Doria" — 4:12
 "Gesso" ("Giz") — 3:27
 "Sette Citta" ("Sete Cidades") — 4:07
 "Se Restei Aspetando Il Mio Amor Passar" ("Se Fiquei Esperando Meu Amor Passar") — 5:16
 "Santa Lucia Luntana" — 3:03

Composing credits
All songs originally composed by Renato Russo, Dado Villa Lobos, and Marcelo Bonfá, except:
 "Por Enquanto" by Renato Russo
 "Monte Castelo" by Renato Russo, lyrics based on 1 Corinthians 13 and Camões' Sonnet 11
 "Santa Lucia Luntana" by Giovanni Gaeta, arranged by Carlos Trilha and Fernando Morello
Italian lyrics adaptation by Gabriele Dell'Utri (tracks 1, 9, 10) and Gianfranco Fabra (tracks 2, 3, 4, 5, 6, 7, 8)

External links
 Jerry Adriani official site
 Lyrics

1999 albums